Mahmoud Fahmy El Nokrashy Pasha (April 26, 1888 – December 28, 1948) was an Egyptian political figure. He was the second prime minister of the Kingdom of Egypt.

Early life and education
Nokrashy was born in Alexandria on 26 April 1888 to a middle-class family. His father was an Egyptian accountant, and his mother, Hanifa was of Turkish origin. Nokrashy was a graduate of the Ras Al Tin high school.

Career
Nokrashy Pasha was a member of the Saadist Institutional Party (SIP) which supported a liberal monarchist programme. He was also a member of the secret apparatus of the Wafd Party, Egypt's then main nationalist party.

Nokrashy Pasha served as the prime minister of Egypt twice. His first term was from 1945 to 1946 (he initially came to power after the murder of Ahmad Mahir Pasha) and the second from 1946 to 1948. His second cabinet was a coalition government comprising members of the Saadist Institutional Party and the Liberal Constitutional Party. 

In 1948, Nokrashy Pasha became very concerned with the assertiveness and popularity of the Muslim Brotherhood. Rumours of a Brotherhood coup against the monarchy and government had appeared, and the Brotherhood had already been implicated in the killing of Nokrashy Pasha's predecessor. Shortly after these rumours first gained currency, the prime minister formally outlawed the Brotherhood in December 1948, and this led directly to his own assassination. In addition to the Brotherhood being officially declared an illegal organization, the assets of the Brotherhood were seized by the government and many Brotherhood members went to prison.

Assassination
Less than three weeks after these activities against the Brotherhood, Nokrashy Pasha was gunned down by Abdel Meguid Ahmed Hassan, who was a veterinary student at the University of King Fouad I and a member of the Brotherhood. The slaying occurred on 28 December 1948 at 10:00 am. Nokrashy Pasha was killed in the main building of the Ministry of Interior by Hassan, who was wearing the uniform of a lieutenant. Hassan shot him twice. This crime in turn led to the assassination (by the political police) of Muslim Brotherhood leader Hasan Al Banna on 12 February 1949: despite the fact that Banna had condemned the murder of the prime minister, and had publicly called it a terrorist act incompatible with Islam.

Hassan was arrested after the murder, and confessed that he was a member of the Brotherhood. He reported that it was the prime minister's decision to crack down upon the Brotherhood that had motivated him to carry out the shooting.  Found guilty at his trial, he was soon afterwards hanged; three men who had knowingly helped him plan the assassination were sentenced to penal servitude for life.

References

External links
 

1888 births
1948 deaths
19th-century Egyptian people
20th-century prime ministers of Egypt
Egyptian people of Turkish descent 
Assassinated Egyptian politicians
Assassinated heads of government
Egyptian pashas
Foreign ministers of Egypt
People murdered in Egypt
Prime Ministers of Egypt
1948 murders in Egypt